The following is a list of indoor arenas in Albania, ranked by capacity.

Current arenas

See also 
List of indoor arenas in Europe
List of indoor arenas by capacity

References 

 
Albania
Indoor arenas